Midtjyske Jernbaner A/S (abbreviated MJBA) is a Danish railway company operating in Region Midtjylland, Denmark.

See also 
Lemvigbanen
Odderbanen
Rail transport in Denmark

External links 
 Midtjyske Jernbaner

References 

Railway companies of Denmark
Companies based in Lemvig Municipality
Railway companies established in 2008